Nathalie Mallet is a Canadian mystery, science fiction and fantasy writer.

Early life 
Mallet grew up in Shippagan, New Brunswick, and resides in Prince George, British Columbia.

Career 
Mallet's debut novel, The Princes of the Golden Cage published by Night Shade Books in 2007, is the first installment in the Prince Amir Mystery series. The second book in the series, The King's Daughters, is scheduled for 2008.

Bibliography

The Prince Amir Mystery Series

 The Princes of the Golden Cage (2007)()
 The King's Daughters   (summer 2009)
 Death in the Traveling City   (summer 2011)

Others

  The Digging Crew (LTDBooks, 2005)

External links
Interview with Nathalie Mallet at SCI FI Wire
NathalieMallet's Blog
Night Shade Books
Official site of Nathalie Mallet
Synopsis and cover art at FantasyLiterature.net

Canadian fantasy writers
Canadian women novelists
Writers from British Columbia
Living people
Canadian science fiction writers
Women science fiction and fantasy writers
Year of birth missing (living people)
21st-century Canadian novelists
21st-century Canadian women writers